Macfarlan may refer to:

Places:
 Macfarlan, West Virginia, an unincorporated community in West Virginia

People:
 George Macfarlan (1837/38–1868), British-born New Zealand politician
 Ian Macfarlan (1881–1964), Australian politician
 James Macfarlan (1832–1862), Scottish poet
 Robert Macfarlan (born 1949), Australian judge
 Robert Macfarlan (schoolmaster) (1734–1804), Scottish writer
 Dandridge MacFarlan Cole (1921–1965), American aerospace engineer
 Robert MacFarlan Cole III (1889–1986), American chemical engineer

Other uses:
 Macfarlan Ministry, government of Victoria, Australia, led by Ian Macfarlan
 MacFarlan Smith, Scottish pharmaceutical research company

See also
 McFarlan
 MacFarlane (disambiguation)
 McFarlane (disambiguation)